El Shafee Elsheikh (born 16 July 1988), known as Jihadi Ringo, is a Sudanese Islamist terrorist who took part in atrocities of the Islamic State of Iraq and the Levant (ISIL, also known as ISIS and IS) as one of the four so-called Jihadi Beatles. He was found guilty of eight charges of hostage taking and murder by an American court in 2022 and later sentenced to eight life sentences without the possibility of parole.

Early life
Born in Sudan, Elsheikh spent his youth in London, England. The Daily Telegraph reports he was a follower of a local football team, Queen's Park Rangers, and dreamed of joining the team when he grew up.

Terrorist activity
In 2014 and 2015, ISIL held dozens of European and North American captives, and the brutal conditions of their detention were widely reported. Four English-speaking terrorists played a central role in the brutality. Their identities were initially either not known or security officials did not make their identities known to the public. Due to their British accents, their captives dubbed them The Beatles, with Mohammed Emwazi, the most well-known of the group, having been dubbed "Jihadi John". Later, Elsheikh was reported to have been one of the other three Beatles.

On 30 March 2017, Elsheikh and four other men were named as suspected terrorists, by the United States State Department, under Executive Order 13224. This Executive Order signed by US President George W. Bush, shortly after al Qaeda's attacks on 9/11, allowed the State Department to bar US citizens, US financial institutions, and other US corporations, from having any financial transactions with designated individuals.

Syrian Democratic Forces (SDF) captured Elsheikh, and his friend Alexanda Kotey, on 24 January 2018 as he was fleeing from the collapse of ISIL, the short-lived "Islamic State". The pair were reported to have been trying to blend in with genuine civilian refugees, fleeing the collapse of the last ISIL enclaves.

Prosecution
The Independent reported that the United Kingdom government was considering agreeing that Kotey and Elsheikh could be transferred to the Guantanamo detention camps. Detention in Guantanamo could be indefinite detention, without charge, if transferred to US custody. For a civilian trial, they would likely be detained at the Supermax prison in Florence, Colorado, if they were convicted.

Another option under consideration is trial at the International Court in The Hague. According to The Independent, the UK government would first strip Kotey and Elsheikh of UK citizenship, prior to agreeing to transfer to The Hague.

The Guardian quoted Tobias Ellwood, the UK Minister of Defence, who argued that transfer to Guantanamo was inappropriate. In a face-to-face interview with Jenan Moussa of Al Aan TV in Kobanî, Syria, at the beginning of April 2018 Elsheikh said he was interviewed by US and SDF officials, but not by UK officials.

On 7 October 2020, Elsheikh and Alexanda Kotey were brought to the United States to face charges of beheading western hostages. Elsheikh denied being a member of "the Beatles" but admitted joining the ISIL terrorist group. On 14 April 2022, after a three week trial, he was found guilty of lethal hostage taking and conspiracy to commit murder and on 19 August 2022, was sentenced to eight life sentences without the possibility of parole. Elsheikh plans to appeal his conviction.

On 24 September 2022, Elsheikh was transferred into the custody of the Federal Bureau of Prisons and designated to United States Penitentiary, Florence High. Some members of the victims of family expressed disappointment in the Bureau of Prisons for designating Elsheikh and Kotey to high-security penitentiaries instead of the federal supermax ADX Florence. David Spencer of the Center for Crime Prevention slammed the decision claiming it was a "soft" punishment for the actions of Elsheikh and Kotey. On March 3, 2023, Elsheikh was transferred from USP Florence - High to ADX Florence.

References 

1988 births
British people imprisoned abroad
Islamic State of Iraq and the Levant members
Living people
People extradited to the United States
People extradited from Iraq
People convicted of kidnapping
People convicted of murder by the United States federal government
Inmates of ADX Florence
Sudanese Islamists